Daily Imroze is an Urdu language newspaper in Pakistan published daily from Karachi.

This is one of the oldest newspapers of Pakistan that originally started publishing from Lahore in the newly independent Pakistan soon after 1947. It had distinguished people like Maqbool Jahangir, Ahmad Nadeem Qasmi, Intezar Hussain and Shafqat Tanvir Mirza among its journalists, columnists and editors from 1950s to 1970s. 

In 2016, it is being published as an online newspaper in the Urdu language from Karachi.

References

External links

Daily newspapers published in Pakistan
Mass media in Karachi
Urdu-language newspapers published in Pakistan